Banque d'Hochelaga was a Canadian bank based in Montreal, Quebec. It was active from 1874 until 1924, when it merged with the Banque Nationale to form Banque Canadienne Nationale.

History

In 1874, several Montreal French-Canadian businessmen founded Banque d'Hochelaga, including François-Xavier Saint-Charles, Louis-Amable Jetté, Frédéric-Liguori Béique and Louis Tourville.

The bank opened branches in Montréal, Sherbrooke and St-Jérôme.

Like the other Canadian chartered banks, it issued its own paper money. In 1934, the Bank of Canada was established as Canada's central bank through the Bank of Canada Act, and the commercial banks lost the right to issue their own currency.

After modest beginnings, the bank expanded substantially around 1900. At the end of World War I, Banque Nationale (based in Quebec City), Provincial Bank of Canada (Banque Provinciale) and Banque d'Hochelaga all competed to serve the French-speaking Quebec market.

In 1924 an unarmoured bank vehicle carrying silver was robbed and a bank employee killed.

After financial reverses during a recession hurt the Banque Nationale at the beginning of the 1920s, it agreed to merge with Banque d'Hochelaga to form Banque Canadienne Nationale, with assistance provided by the Quebec provincial government. The merger was completed in 1924. The headquarters of the merged bank was in Montreal. The Provincial Bank chose not to participate in the merger.

Presidents of Banque d'Hochelaga

 1874-1878: Louis Tourville
 1878-1900: François-Xavier Saint-Charles
 1900-1912: Jean-Damien Rolland
 1912-1925: Janvier-A.Vaillancourt

See also
 List of Canadian banks

References

 Mémoire du Québec
 Banque d'Hochelaga, photograph of building
 Banque d'Hochelaga in 1915

Defunct banks of Canada
Banks established in 1874
Banks disestablished in 1924
1874 establishments in Quebec
Companies based in Montreal
Canadian companies established in 1874
1924 disestablishments in Quebec